Vangelis Theocharis (Greek: Βαγγέλης Θεοχάρης, born 28 May 1999) is a Greek professional footballer who plays as a defender for Super League 2 club Apollon Smyrnis.

Career

Panathinaikos
Theocharis plays mainly as a defender and joined Panathinaikos from the team's youth ranks.

Career statistics

References

1998 births
Living people
Greek footballers
Panathinaikos F.C. players
Levadiakos F.C. players
Super League Greece players
Association football midfielders
Footballers from Livadeia